Philippines is a member of the South East Asian Zone of the Olympic Council of Asia (OCA), and has participated in the Asian Games since their inception in 1951. The Philippine Olympic Committee, established in 1911, and recognized in 1929 by the International Olympic Committee, is the National Olympic Committee for Philippines.

Philippines was one of the first five founding members of the Asian Games Federation on February 13, 1949, in New Delhi, the organization which was disbanded on November 26, 1981, and replaced by the Olympic Council of Asia.

Membership of Olympic Council of Asia
Philippines is a member of the South East Asian Zone of the Olympic Council of Asia, the governing body of all the sports in Asia, recognized by the International Olympic Committee as the continental association of Asia. Being a member of the Southeast Asian Zone, Philippines also participates in the Southeast Asian Games, sub-regional Games for Southeast Asia.

The OCA organizes five major continental-level multi-sport events: the Asian Summer Games (which are commonly known as the Asian Games), Asian Winter Games, Asian Indoor-Martial Arts Games, Asian Beach Games, and Asian Youth Games. Before 2009, Indoor and Martial Arts were two separate events, specialised for indoor and martial arts sports respectively. However, since then the OCA has amalgamated them into a single event, the Asian Indoor-Martial Arts Games, which was debuted in 2013 in Incheon, South Korea. As a member of OCA, Philippines is privileged to participate in all these multi-sport events.

Asian Games Results

Philippines is one of the only seven countries that have competed in all editions of the Asian Games. The other six are Indonesia, Japan, India, Sri Lanka, Singapore and Thailand. With a total of 411 medals, Philippines is currently ranked 12th at the all-time Asian Games medal table.

Medalists by sport
List of Philippine Asian Games medalists

Asian Para Games Results

Medals by edition
Ranking is based on the Total Gold medals earned.

Medalists

Asian Winter Games Results

The Philippines has never won a medal in the Asian Winter Games.

Medals by edition

Asian Beach Games Results

The Philippines has sent its delegations to both editions of the Asian Beach Games—a biennial multi-sport event which features sporting events played on seaside beach. At the 2008 Games in Bali, the Philippines won a total of 10 medals, leading to the country finishing 21st in the medal table. The Philippines sent a delegation composed of 23 athletes for the 2010 Asian Beach Games held in Muscat, Oman from December 8 to 16, 2010. The Philippines was one of the 18 National Olympic Committees that did not win any medal in the Games.

Medals by edition
Ranking is based on the Total Gold medals earned.

Medalists

Asian Indoor and Martial Arts Games Results

Medals by edition

Ranking is based on the Total Gold medals earned.

Medalists

Asian Indoor Games Results

The Philippines has sent athletes to all editions of the Asian Indoor Games. In the 2005 Asian Indoor Games, held in Bangkok, Thailand, from November 12 to 19, 2005, the Philippines won total four medals, including a gold. Total six medals were won by Filipino athletes during the 2007 Games in Macau, held from October 26 to November 3, 2007. Filipino contingents gave the best performance, in terms of the total number of medals earned, during the 2009 Games held in Hanoi, Vietnam, from October 30 to November 8, winning 10 medals overall.

Medals by edition
Ranking is based on the Total Gold medals earned.

Medalists

Asian Martial Arts Games Results

The Philippines competed in the First Asian Martial Arts Games held in Bangkok, Thailand, from August 1 to 9, 2009. The Philippines won total 18 medals (with two gold), and finished in the 12th spot. Jeffrey Figueroa won a gold in the bantamweight class of taekwondo after defeating Rezai Hasan of Afghanistan by 10–7 in the final. Another gold was won by Mary Jane Estimar in the sanshou 52 kg event of wushu. Estimar defeated Si Si Sein of Myanmar in the final by two to nil points difference.

Medals by edition

Ranking is based on the Total Gold medals earned.

Medalists

Asian Youth Games Results

The Philippines participated in the 2009 Asian Youth Games held in Singapore from June 29 to July 7, 2009. The Philippines earned two medals in the Games, but no gold, and finished in the 18th spot in the medal table.

Medals by editions

Asian Youth Para Games Results

Medals by editions

See also

Philippines at the Olympics
Philippines at the Southeast Asian Games

Notes and references
Notes

 The National Olympic Committees are all members of the Association of National Olympic Committees (ANOC), which is also split among five continental associations: Association of National Olympic Committees of Africa, Pan American Sports Organization, Olympic Council of Asia, European Olympic Committees, and Oceania National Olympic Committees.

References